The Municipality of Rače–Fram is a municipality south of Maribor in northeastern Slovenia. Its administrative seat is the settlement of Rače. The area was traditionally was part of the Styria region. It is now included in the Drava Statistical Region. The Ljubljana–Maribor motorway and railway line run through the municipality.

Settlements
In addition to the municipal seat of Rače, the municipality also includes the following settlements:

 Brezula
 Fram
 Ješenca
 Kopivnik
 Loka pri Framu
 Morje
 Planica
 Podova
 Požeg
 Ranče
 Šestdobe
 Spodnja Gorica
 Zgornja Gorica

References

External links
 
 Municipality of Rače–Fram on Geopedia
 Rače–Fram municipal site

Race
1994 establishments in Slovenia